The Georgia PGA Championship is a golf tournament that is the section championship of the Georgia section of the PGA of America. It has been played annually since 1962 at a variety of courses around the state.

Winners

2022 Tim Weinhart
2021 Jabir Bilal
2020 J.P. Griffin
2019 Paul Claxton
2018 Paul Claxton
2017 Tim Weinhart
2016 Tim Weinhart
2015 James Mason
2014 Hank Smith
2013 Craig Stevens
2012 Sonny Skinner
2011 Stephen Keppler
2010 Craig Stevens
2009 Sonny Skinner
2008 Clark Spratlin
2007 Matt Peterson
2006 Greg Lee
2005 Tim Weinhart
2004 Jeff Hull
2003 Chan Reeves
2002 Chan Reeves
2001 Craig Stevens
2000 James Mason
1999 James Mason
1998 Mike Cook
1997 James Mason
1996 Stephen Keppler
1995 Craig Hartle
1994 Stephen Keppler
1993 Tommy Brannen
1992 Danny Elkins
1991 Bill Robinson
1990 Stephen Keppler
1989 Toby Chapin
1988 Gregg Wolff
1987 Gregg Wolff
1986 Craig Hartle
1985 Gregg Wolff
1984 DeWitt Weaver
1983 Richard Crawford
1982 Richard Crawford
1981 Dan Murphy
1980 Alan White
1979 DeWitt Weaver
1978 DeWitt Weaver
1977 Wayne Yates
1976 Paul Moran
1975 Paul Moran
1974 DeWitt Weaver
1973 Davis Love Jr.
1972 Wayne Yates
1971 DeWitt Weaver
1970 DeWitt Weaver
1969 Emory Lee
1968 Davis Love Jr.
1967 Jim Ferree
1966 DeWitt Weaver
1965 Jim Stamps
1964 Hugh Royer Jr.
1963 Hugh Royer Jr.
1962 Dick Cline

External links
PGA of America – Georgia section
List of winners

Golf in Georgia (U.S. state)
PGA of America sectional tournaments
Recurring sporting events established in 1962